The National Centre for HIV/AIDS Dermatology and STDs (NCHADS) is a government agency of Cambodia under the direction of the Ministry of Health.  The agency is devoted to managing the treatment and prophylaxis of HIV and STDs.  NCHADS' main offices are located in Phnom Penh.

Sites
 National Center for HIV/AIDS, Dermatology and STD
 National Dermatology and STD Clinic
 OI-ART
 Voluntary Confidential Counseling and Testing (VCCT) - 217 sites throughout the country
 Family Health Clinic (STI Clinic)
 Home Base Care
 Social Health Clinic

See also
 Dermatology
 Government of Cambodia
 Health in Cambodia
 HIV/AIDS in Cambodia
 Ministry of Health, Cambodia

References

External links
 

Medical and health organisations based in Cambodia
HIV/AIDS organizations
Government health agencies
Phnom Penh
Government ministries of Cambodia